The 2020–21 I-League (known as the Hero I-League for sponsorship reasons) was the 14th season of the I-League, one of the top tier Indian professional football leagues, since its establishment in 2007. The tournament was hosted in bio-secure bubble across four venues in Kolkata due to COVID-19 pandemic situation in India.

Mohun Bagan was declared the champion of the 2019–20 season after the cancellation of matches due to the COVID-19 pandemic, since the second placed team could not catch up even if all 20 games were completed. However, following Mohun Bagan's merger with Indian Super League (ISL) club ATK, the club began competing in the ISL from the 2020–21 ISL season.

Throughout the First Phase, Churchill Brothers kept its dominance with an unbeaten run of 11 games, while in the Second Phase, Gokulam Kerala, Churchill Brothers and TRAU traded the lead several times throughout the Championship Stage. Entering the final matchday, Gokulam Kerala were ahead on goal difference. However, with the Gokulam and TRAU facing off, either team could claim the title with a win. A draw in the Gokulam Kerala–TRAU match and a win were needed for Churchill Brothers to be crowned champions. The game ended in a 4–1 win for Gokulam, giving the Malabarians their first I-league title and qualification for the AFC Cup. NEROCA finished bottom of the Relegation Stage and were to relegated, but were reinstated by AIFF after the viewing the situation of Covid-19 pandemic.

Changes from last season

Changes in rules and regulations
AIFF has implemented the '3+1' foreigners rule from this season. Under this rule, each club will be allowed to field a maximum of four foreign players and one of those four foreign players must be from an AFC affiliated country.
Due to COVID-19 pandemic, this season's league format was shortened. All teams will face each other once in the first leg of the league, then they will be divided into two different groups. According to points table from first leg, top six teams will face each other once again in the Championship stage, where the team with most points (cumulative points collected from all fifteen matches) will be declared the winner of the league and qualify for the 2022 AFC Cup group stage. The other five teams will play against each other in a Relegation stage where the team with the lowest points (cumulative points collected from all fourteen matches) will be relegated to the 2nd Division League.

Number of clubs
All India Football Federation (AIFF) issued an invitation to accept bids for new clubs from non I-League cities, like Delhi, Gangtok, Ranchi, Jaipur, Jodhpur, Mangalore, Bhopal, Lucknow, Kanpur, Ahmedabad and Calicut among many others, to join the league from 2020 onwards. The invitation mentioned that the entity which wins the bid will be granted the right to own and operate a new football club. On 12 August, AIFF announced that Sudeva of Delhi would join the league from this season and Sreenidi Deccan, which is based in Hyderabad, will be playing from Visakhapatnam from the following season.

East Bengal and Mohun Bagan moved to the Indian Super League, when East Bengal joined the league as an expansion team, while Mohun Bagan and ATK, the champions of 2019–20 ISL season, merged to play as ATK Mohun Bagan in the ISL.

Promoted clubs
Promoted from the 2019–20 2nd Division League
 Mohammedan

Relegated clubs
Relegated from the 2019–20 I-League
None

Teams

Stadiums and locations 
Due to COVID-19 pandemic, all the matches will be played in a single venue. AIFF declared Kolkata as the venue on 14 August. Matches will be played in Vivekananda Yuba Bharati Krirangan, Kishore Bharati Krirangan and Mohun Bagan Ground in Kolkata, and Kalyani Stadium in Kalyani.

Personnel and sponsorship

Head coaching changes

Transfers

Foreign players

Minimum of three and maximum of four foreign players including one player from AFC—affiliated country per team. Indian Arrows cannot sign any foreign players as they are a part of AIFF's developmental program. The newly joined team, Sudeva Delhi will field an all-Indian squad for its debut I-League season.
 Players name in bold indicates the players who are capped for their respective national team.

First phase

Standings

Fixtures and results 
All matches were played at neutral venues. The "home" and "away" are designated for administrative purposes.

Positions by matchday

Results by games

Second phase

Championship stage (Group A)

Fixtures and results
All matches were played at neutral venues. The "home" and "away" are designated for administrative purposes.

Positions by matchday

Results by games

Relegation stage (Group B)

Fixtures and results
All matches were played at neutral venues. The "home" and "away" are designated for administrative purposes.

Positions by matchday

Results by games

Final standings

Season statistics

Scoring

Top scorers
The table includes only the top 10 goalscorers of this season.

Top Indian scorers
The table includes only the list of top Indian goalscorers with more than 2 goals in this season.

Top assists
The table includes only the top 10 assist providers of the season.

Hat-tricks

Clean Sheets

The table includes only the list of top goalkeepers with more than 1 cleansheet in this season.

Discipline 

 Most yellow cards: 5
 Lalrindika Ralte (Real Kashmir)
Sairuat Kima (Sudeva Delhi)

 Most red cards: 2
Vincy Barretto (Gokulam Kerala)

Awards

 Match 1 - Match 55 = First Phase
 Match 56 - Match 80 = Second Phase

Hero of the Match

Season awards

Team of the season

Source: arunfoot.com

See also 
 2020–21 Indian Super League season

References 

 
I-League seasons
1
India